Earl Hervie Wight was an American football and basketball coach and college athletics administrator. He served as the head football coach at Fresno State Normal School—now known  as California State University, Fresno—in 1944, compiling a record of 0–6. Wight was also the head basketball coach at the University of California, Berkeley from 1920 to 1924, tallying a mark of 64—20. He was hired by Fresno State in 1924 as athletic director and served in that role until 1947. Wight attended Pomona College in Claremont, California, where he played football, basketball, and baseball. He also earned a master's degree from the University of California, Berkeley in 1920.

Head coaching record

Football

References

Year of birth missing
Year of death missing
California Golden Bears men's basketball coaches
Fresno State Bulldogs baseball coaches
Fresno State Bulldogs football coaches
Pomona-Pitzer Sagehens baseball players
Pomona-Pitzer Sagehens football players
Pomona-Pitzer Sagehens men's basketball players
University of California, Berkeley alumni
Pomona College alumni